The Golden Pillow is a 40-episode epic drama produced by the Television Corporation of Singapore (now MediaCorp) in 1995.

Synopsis
The story is about Ren Niang, who attempts to find success and happiness in his life. Born in Thailand, Ren Niang goes to Singapore in search of his long-lost biological father Sai Qilin and gets entangled in a love triangle along the way. He chances upon a mysterious "golden pillow" rumoured to possess magical powers. Part of the plot involves various characters trying to get their hands on the golden pillow.

Legacy
The series was one of earliest Singaporean drama series to be filmed on location overseas (part of it was filmed in Europe).

At the Star Awards 2007 anniversary special celebrating 25 years of local Chinese television, the scene of Fann Wong, Zoe Tay and Alex Man "listening" to the golden pillow was named one of the top 5 most memorable scenes. Xie Shaoguang's character Sai Wei was voted one of the top 10 most memorable villains.

Awards

External links
The Golden Pillow (English) on Mediacorp website
The Golden Pillow (Chinese) on Mediacorp website

Singapore Chinese dramas
1995 Singaporean television series debuts
1996 Singaporean television series endings
1990s Singaporean television series
Channel 8 (Singapore) original programming